Pseudoporopterus is a genus of weevils belonging to the family Curculionidae.

Species
 Pseudoporopterus bivittatus
 Pseudoporopterus impius
 Pseudoporopterus irrasus
 Pseudoporopterus karnyi
 Pseudoporopterus karryi
 Pseudoporopterus leai
 Pseudoporopterus lemur
 Pseudoporopterus minahassus
 Pseudoporopterus mitratus
 Pseudoporopterus pertinax
 Pseudoporopterus pertinax
 Pseudoporopterus simulator
 Pseudoporopterus solus
 Pseudoporopterus sulcicollis
 Pseudoporopterus sulcifrons

References 

 Katsura Morimoto ON THE GENERA OF ORIENTAL CRYPTORHYNCHINAE (COLEOPTERA : CURCULIONIDAE) Esakia 11: 121-143 (1978)